The 2019 Savannah mayoral election held an initial round on November 5, 2019, with a runoff held on December 3, 2019. Incumbent mayor Eddie DeLoach was defeated by longtime alderman Van R. Johnson.

First round

Runoff

References

Mayoral elections in Savannah, Georgia
2019 Georgia (U.S. state) elections
Savannah